B. C. P. Jansen (1 April 1884, Zwolle – 18 October 1962) was a Dutch chemist and biochemist. In the Dutch Indies, with his colleague  W. F. Donath, he isolated in crystalline form an anti-beriberi factor (known as vitamine B1 or aneurin)  from rice polishings and named it thiamine (sulfur-containing amine). It was the first vitamine to be obtained in pure form.

Jansen was elected a corresponding member of the Royal Netherlands Academy of Arts and Sciences in 1927, he resigned in 1929. He was re-admitted as member in 1946.

References
Sources
Rudolph A. Peters, Obituary notice: Professor Dr Chem. Barend Coenraad Petrus Jansen, Br. J. Nutr. (1964), 18, 1.

Specific

1884 births
1962 deaths
20th-century Dutch chemists
Dutch biochemists
Members of the Royal Netherlands Academy of Arts and Sciences
People from Zwolle
University of Amsterdam alumni
Utrecht University alumni
Academic staff of the University of Amsterdam